Small format is the group of film formats that are 35 mm or smaller.

Film gauges referred to as small format include:

 35 mm format (Full Frame; FX)
 24 mm format (DX)
 Advanced Photo System (APS)
 35 mm film / 135 film / full frame
 16 mm film
 8 mm film
 1-inch digital (CX)

See also
 Ultra Large Format, 10 inches and more
 Large format, 4 to 10 inches
 Medium format, 35 to 130 mm
 828 film
 126 film
 110 film

References

Film formats